Guillermo W. Méndez (born 1955) is a Guatemalan theologian,
educated in Guatemala,
Central America, and in North America.  After two decades serving as a Theology Professor in Guatemala, deeply challenged by Liberation Theology, he researched Law, Economics and Politics.  Former member of the Latin American Theological Fraternity and the theological commission of the World Evangelical Fellowship, he developed a concern for the poor and engaged in the transformation of the Civil Law system of his native Guatemala, to undermine the privileges of the ruling political class and reform, through political and legal means, the State of Guatemala.

Professor Méndez has proposed the celebration of a national and international day of Freedom of Conscience, a celebration growing since 2003 in Guatemala, to call attention to the intromission of the legal system in matters of conscience, and to rethink the participation of Christians in political and social change. Founder of the Institute of Services to the Nation (ISN), a private funded civic organization registered in the Supreme Electoral Tribunal, ISN teaches and organizes population for change from a Judeo Christian perspective.  Professor Méndez team teaches History of Religion in Universidad Francisco Marroquín, Guatemala.

Bibliography 
Author of:
 
 
 
 
 

Contributor to:
 .
 .

Education 
 B. A.      Central American Theological Seminary (1978)
 S. T. M. Dallas Theological Seminary (1982)
 M. A. S. Universidad Francisco Marroquín (1994)

References

Living people
1955 births
Guatemalan Roman Catholics
20th-century Roman Catholic theologians
Universidad Francisco Marroquín alumni
Academic staff of Universidad Francisco Marroquín
21st-century Roman Catholic theologians